The Tampa Bay Rays farm system consists of seven Minor League Baseball affiliates across the United States and in the Dominican Republic. Four teams are independently owned, while three—the Florida Complex League Rays and two Dominican Summer League Rays squads—are owned by the major league club.

The Rays have been affiliated with the Triple-A Durham Bulls of the International League since 1998, making it the longest-running active affiliation in the organization among teams not owned by the Rays. Their newest affiliate is the Charleston RiverDogs of the Carolina League, which became the Rays' Single-A club in 2021.

Tampa Bay Rays

2021–present
The current structure of Minor League Baseball is the result of an overall contraction of the system beginning with the 2021 season. Class A was reduced to two levels: High-A and Low-A. Class A Short Season teams and domestic Rookie League teams that operated away from Spring Training facilities were eliminated. Low-A was reclassified as Single-A in 2022.

1996–2020
Minor League Baseball operated with six classes from 1990 to 2020. The Class A level was subdivided for a second time with the creation of Class A-Advanced. The Rookie level consisted of domestic and foreign circuits.

References

External links
 Major League Baseball Prospect News: Tampa Bay Rays
 Baseball-Reference: Tampa Bay Rays League Affiliations

Minor league affiliates
Tampa Bay Rays minor league affiliates